The St. Louis Bombers were a National Basketball Association team based in St. Louis from 1946 to 1950.

Franchise history 
The St. Louis Bombers were originally part of the Basketball Association of America (BAA) in 1946. 

The BAA merged with the National Basketball League (NBL) in 1949 to become the National Basketball Association (NBA).  

The Bombers were one of seven teams that quickly left the NBA. The NBA contracted after the 1949–50 season, losing six of its 17 teams. The Anderson Packers, Sheboygan Red Skins and Waterloo Hawks jumped to the NPBL, while the Chicago Stags, Denver Nuggets and Bombers folded.  Midway through the 1950–51 season, the Washington Capitols folded as well, bringing the number of teams in the league down to ten.

The NBA would return to St. Louis in 1955 when the Milwaukee Hawks became the St. Louis Hawks. Ed Macauley would end up back in St. Louis in a deal that sent Bill Russell to the Boston Celtics, and played a key role in the Hawks 1958 NBA championship.

Arena
The Bombers played at the St. Louis Arena. The arena was torn down in 1999.

Notable alumni

Players

Naismith Basketball Hall of Fame

Season-by-season record 

  The 1948 BAA Playoffs did not establish Eastern and Western finalists and generated one finalist from the East, one from the West, only by coincidence. Philadelphia and St. Louis were the finalists from the Eastern and Western divisions and met in a best-of-seven series to determine one league championship finalist.
  The 1949 BAA Playoffs matched Eastern teams exclusively, and Western teams exclusively, so that the league semifinals generated Eastern and Western finalists as well as championship finalists.

References

 
Defunct National Basketball Association teams
Bombers
Basketball Association of America teams
Basketball teams established in 1946
Basketball teams disestablished in 1950
1946 establishments in Missouri
1950 disestablishments in Missouri